Longing for My Native Country is a 1981 Chinese drama film directed by Hu Bingliu and Wang Jin. It was entered into the 32nd Berlin International Film Festival.

Cast
 Huang Jinchang - Liao Yiping
 Huang Xiaolei - Tian Gui
 Ren Yexiang - Tian Cuicui
 Wang Jin - Kuanghua
 Wang Qinbao - Lili
 Wu Wenhua - Tian Qiuyue

References

External links

1981 films
1980s Mandarin-language films
1981 drama films
Chinese drama films